Christine Morrissey is a Canadian LGBT activist who challenged immigration laws and has led organizations that support LGBT newcomers, refugees and asylum seekers. She is a recipient of the Officer of the Order of Canada award.

Activism 
In January 1992, Morrissey challenged Canada's immigration laws when her Irish-American partner's application for immigration was rejected, as their relationship was not considered to fall within the "family class" category, which was limited to heterosexual relationships. She brought a constitutional challenge to court, arguing that her partner's rejection was discriminatory, on the basis of sexual orientation. In October 1992, Morrissey's partner's application was granted as an independent, allowing her partner to stay in the country but enabling Canada to maintain its immigration policy. The significance of the case was that the Canadian government admitted they were unable to win the case and that undue discrimination was occurring because of immigration legislation. In 2001, Canada updated its immigration laws to include same sex partners as members of family.

Also in the 1990s, Morrissey and others founded Lesbian and Gay Immigration Taskforce (LEGIT) in Vancouver to help same-sex couples of different nationalities find legal loopholes to enable their cohabitation within Canada. Morrissey has since led Rainbow Refugee in Canada, an organization that assists LGBT individuals leave countries where persecution exists because of one's sexual orientation and resettle in Canada.

References 

Living people
Year of birth missing (living people)
Place of birth missing (living people)
Canadian women activists
Canadian LGBT rights activists
Officers of the Order of Canada
Women civil rights activists